Sundowner is a motor yacht formerly owned by Charles Lightoller, who was Second Officer aboard the  for her ill-fated maiden voyage in April, 1912.

She participated in the Dunkirk evacuation as one of the "little ships" as well as a number of commemorations of the event, and is now a museum ship at the Ramsgate Maritime Museum in Southern England.

Construction 
Originally built in 1912, the former Admiralty steam pinnace was bought in 1929 for £40 (equivalent to £ today) by Charles and Sylvia Lightoller. The hull was recovered from the mud at Conyer Creek east of the River Medway and was fitted with two masts and ketch-rigged with jib, mainsail, mizzen and mizzen staysail. Due to Sylvia being Australian, they named their converted yacht Sundowner, an Australian term for a tramp or hobo.

Sundowner was launched on 28 June 1930, and after trials on the Thames, undertook her first voyage to France. During the next ten years the Lightollers cruised along the northern coast of Europe, taking part successfully in many international competitions. In 1936 Lightoller replaced the engine with a more powerful  Gleniffer diesel engine giving her an extra .  In 1939, with the threat of war looming, Lightoller was tasked to secretly survey the European coast for the Admiralty.

Dunkirk 
On 31 May 1940, Sundowner was requisitioned by the Admiralty to sail to Dunkirk to assist in the evacuation. Lightoller, aged 66 and retired, volunteered to take her, along with his eldest son Roger, and Gerald Ashcroft, an 18-year-old Sea Scout.

Leaving the Port of Ramsgate at 10:00 on 1 June, the yacht crossed the Channel in company with five other ships. On their way, they rescued the crew of the motor cruiser Westerly, which had broken down and was on fire. On arrival at Dunkirk, Lightoller realised that the piers were too high, and so drew alongside the destroyer  and started to take on soldiers. Seventy-five men were crammed into the cabin, and another fifty-five on deck, a total of 130. Sundowner then returned to Ramsgate, avoiding fire from enemy aircraft through evasive manoeuvres on the way, though the greatest danger was being swamped by the wash from fast-moving destroyers. After disembarking the troops, she was preparing to return for France for another load, but by then only ships capable of doing 20 knots were allowed to continue.

Sundowner remained in service as a coastal patrol vessel in the River Blackwater, Essex. She then moved to the River Clyde under the control of 647 Transport Company, Royal Army Service Corps. She was released from service in 1945, and after a refit was returned to Lightoller in 1946, and once again used as a family boat.

Post-war 
Charles Lightoller died in 1952, and his wife Sylvia continued to cruise in Sundowner, taking the helm when she led the Armada of Little Ships on the 25th Anniversary return to Dunkirk in 1965. After passing through several other owners, Sundowner was purchased by the East Kent Maritime Trust after the last owners, Jamie and Baffy Turner had to put into Ramsgate harbour (on passage from the Medway to a new berth in Southampton) in August 1986 for repair to the hull after suffering heavy damage in rough weather. She was restored for the 50th anniversary of Dunkirk in 1990. In 2000 Sundowner also took part in the 60th anniversary flotilla, once more sailing to Dunkirk. On 3 June 2012, Sundowner participated in the Thames Diamond Jubilee Pageant among other "Dunkirk Little Ships".

By September 2022, Sundowner had been transferred into the care of Dennett's Shipbuilders in Chertsey At that time, the ship was in need of major repairs and restoration. That same month, an American TikTok channel creator began work to raise awareness and funds to aid in the ship's restoration.

References

External links 
 National Historic Ships
 East Kent Maritime Trust
 Ramsgate Maritime Museum

1912 ships
Little Ships of Dunkirk
Motor yachts
Museum ships in the United Kingdom
Ramsgate
Ships and vessels of the National Historic Fleet